Homayun (born in 1937 in Mashhad, Iran), born Mohammad-Ali Tabrizian, is an Iranian actor. His most notable roles are in films such as Topoli and Soltan-e Ghalbha.

Filmography

References

External links

Iranian male film actors
People from Mashhad
20th-century Iranian male actors
1937 births
Living people